E950 may refer to:
 Acesulfame potassium, a calorie-free artificial sweetener
 Nikon Coolpix 950, a model of digital camera produced by Nikon
 Samsung SGH-E950, a model of mobile phone produced by Samsung and introduced in 2007